Qicun may refer to the following locations in China:

 Qicun, Shahe (綦村镇), town in Hebei
 Qicun, Shaanxi (齐村镇), in Fuping County
 Qicun, Shandong (齐村镇), town in Shizhong District, Zaozhuang
 Qicun, Shanxi (奇村镇), town in Xinfu District, Xinzhou
 Qicun Township (齐村乡), Hebei